Søren Stryger (born 7 February 1975) is a retired Danish team handball player. He lastly played for the German club SG Flensburg-Handewitt.

He has played on the national team at European and World championships and won several medals with the Danish national handball team.

Private life
He lives with, his wife, Eva and their two sons in Flensburg. He has a Master of Science in Business Administration and Commercial Law.

References

External links
EM Sverige 2002 at Danish Handball Federation
VM portugal 2003 at Danish Handball Federation
EM Slovenien 2005 at Danish Handball Federation
VM Tunesien 2005 at Danish Handball Federation
EM-truppen, Schweiz 2006 at Danish Handball Federation
Portrætfotos af Herre-A VM-truppen 2007 at Danish Handball Federation

1975 births
Living people
Danish male handball players
People from Køge Municipality
Sportspeople from Region Zealand